The Summer of Ben Tyler is an American drama television film that premiered on CBS on December 15, 1996, as part of the Hallmark Hall of Fame anthology series. The film is directed by Arthur Allan Seidelman and written by Robert Inman. It stars James Woods as an up-and-coming lawyer, alongside Elizabeth McGovern, Len Cariou, Julia McIlvaine, Charles Mattocks, Kevin Isola, Clifton James, and Anita Gillette. Woods received a Golden Globe Award nomination for his performance.

Cast
 James Woods as Temple Rayburn
 Elizabeth McGovern as Celia Rayburn
 Len Cariou as Spencer Maitland
 Julia McIlvaine as Nell Rayburn
 Charles Mattocks as Ben Tyler
 Kevin Isola as Junius Maitland
 Clifton James as Sam Thompkins
 Anita Gillette as Suellen
 Millie Perkins as Doris
 Jack Gilpin as Carter Glenn
 Novella Nelson as Rosetta Tyler
 Ed Grady as Dr. Ringgold
 Ronn Carroll as Judge Kragen
 Gregory Perrelli as Scooter Maitland
 Judith Ivey as Narrator

Reception

Critical response
Ray Richmond of Variety gave the film a positive review, writing that "a sumptuously produced gem of a film with a refreshing message of moral heroism, The Summer of Ben Tyler is as poignant, heartwarming and superbly acted as any of the 189 previous Hallmark Hall of Fame productions." John J. O'Connor of The New York Times concluded his review by stating that the film "gets the familiar treatment: a fine cast and top-notch direction. If only the underlying story weren't so insufferably patronizing."

Awards and nominations

References

External links
 
 
 

1996 films
1996 drama films
1996 television films
1990s American films
1990s English-language films
American drama television films
CBS network films
Hallmark Hall of Fame episodes
Films about adoption
Films about families
Films about lawyers
Films about intellectual disability
Films about racism in the United States
Films directed by Arthur Allan Seidelman
Films scored by Van Dyke Parks
Films set in 1942
Films shot in North Carolina
Sonar Entertainment films